Anker Sørensen (3 May 1926 – 19 August 2010) was a Danish film editor and director. He directed 18 films between 1949 and 1973. His 1960 film The Last Winter was entered into the 2nd Moscow International Film Festival.

Selected filmography
 Jenny and the Soldier (1947)
 The Crime of Tove Andersen (1953)
 Laan mig din kone (1957)
 Styrmand Karlsen (1958)
 That Won't Keep a Sailor Down (1958)
 The Last Winter (1960)
 Komtessen (1961)
 Jetpiloter (1961)
 Suddenly, a Woman! (1963)
 The Castle (1964)
 Don Olsen kommer til byen (1964)
 Ghost Train International (1976)

References

External links

1926 births
2010 deaths
Danish film editors
Danish film directors